BabyPinkStar are an Electro glam punk band from Sheffield, England, formed in 2004 with original members Tom, Ben, Alice, and Bleepy.

Career
BabyPinkStar's first gig was at a festival in Sheffield called DevJam, held annually on Devonshire Green. Breezie, a founder member of The Dodgems, joined the band in January 2006 to replace Bleepy the drum machine on drums.

Teaming up with Bonnie Tyler for the collaborated "Total Eclipse of the Heart" led the band to becoming signed to her record label, which at the time was Stick Music Ltd based in France. However, the relationship grew stale between the two parties and BabyPinkStar asked to be relieved from any future commitments to the company.

The band returned to their former label, the independent UnderAchiever Records, and started work on their debut album, 'Let Me Tell You About Her...'.

In late 2007, Ben left the band to pursue a different career, and the band found a replacement in Millie Murdoch. As of 2008, Tom joined The Black Stars, and Breezie left the band to rejoin The Dodgems.

"Poseur"
The first single, "Poseur", released in October 2006, was released on limited edition vinyl and limited edition CD. It is still available to download from sites such as iTunes, Virgin and HMV Digital. To launch the release the band played in store at HMV in Sheffield. The band quickly gained a reputation as quirky and somewhat controversial, after outbursts in interviews from Breezie and Tom. Amongst the chaos BabyPinkStar never took their fans for granted, throwing T-shirts, stickers and badges into the crowds after performances.

"Total Eclipse Of The Heart"
BabyPinkStar together with Bonnie Tyler recorded "Total Eclipse of the Heart" in a punk/electronic remix version, that was available for download on 29 January 2007, and available in the shops from 5 February 2007. The band appeared on Sky News and Channel 5 News. With the band receiving increased media attention at the time, they were invited to play the song at half time at Boleyn Ground, home of West Ham United F.C. This performance also aired live on Sky Sports.

Members
TomPinkStar (Vocals/Guitar)
MilliePinkStar (Rhythm Guitar)
AlicePinkStar (Bass)
Bleepy (Synths)

Former members
BenPinkStar (Rhythm Guitar)
BreeziePinkStar (Drums)

Discography

Singles
"Poseur" / "I Don't Care" (October 2006) - UnderAchiever Records
"Total Eclipse Of The Heart" (January 2007) - Stick Music Ltd

References

External links
BabyPinkStar Official Website
BabyPinkStar's Official Myspace Page

English electronic music groups
English pop music groups
Musical groups from Sheffield